38 Aquarii is a star in the equatorial constellation of Aquarius. 38 Aquarii is its Flamsteed designation; its Bayer designation is e Aquarii. It is a faint star but visible to the naked eye, with an apparent visual magnitude of +5.43.

The spectrum of 38 Aquarii matches a stellar classification of B5 III. A luminosity class of III indicates that this is an evolved giant star. It has 5.6 times the radius of the Sun and is spinning with a projected rotational velocity of 20 km/s. The outer atmosphere of the star has a blue-white glow from an effective temperature of 13,860 K.

References

Aquarius (constellation)
B-type giants
Aquarii, e
Aquarii, 038
109472
210424
8452
BD-12 6196